"Chapter 4: Sanctuary" is the fourth episode of the first season of the American streaming television series The Mandalorian. It was written by the series' showrunner Jon Favreau, directed by Bryce Dallas Howard, and released on Disney+ on November 29, 2019. The episode stars Pedro Pascal as The Mandalorian, a lone bounty hunter who goes into hiding with "the Child". The episode received a Primetime Emmy Awards nomination.

Plot 
On Sorgan, a sparsely populated forested swamp planet, a village of farmers is pillaged by raiders. The Mandalorian soon lands on Sorgan looking to hide from the Guild with "the Child". In a local restaurant, they come across a suspicious mercenary named Cara Dune, a former Rebel shock trooper who had left her position and is hiding on the planet, which she asks the Mandalorian to leave. Back at the Razor Crest, the Mandalorian is approached by two of the villagers hoping to hire him to drive off the raiders. He accepts in return for lodging in the isolated village and uses their payment to hire Dune for extra help. Once in the village, a widowed mother named Omera takes them in and offers them food. Dune and the Mandalorian find a set of tracks in the mud outside the village and identify that the raiders have a powerful Imperial All-Terrain Scout Transport. Dune insists the villagers leave and make their home elsewhere, but they refuse and decide to fight, which the Mandalorian accepts.

The Mandalorian and Dune show the farmers how to defend themselves and then set up traps in the krill ponds for the AT-ST. The Mandalorian and Dune infiltrate the raiders' camp to provoke them into attacking. The AT-ST then chases them back to the village but stops short of the krill ponds. The Klatooinian raiders then attack the villagers, while the AT-ST shoots the village with artillery fire. Dune then gets beneath the AT-ST, shooting into one of the viewports. The AT-ST takes the bait and steps into the pond, sinks, and then falls over. The Mandalorian then throws a thermal detonator into the walker, blowing it up, and the raiders flee back into the forest. A few weeks later, with peace having returned, the Child plays happily with the other children. The Mandalorian tells Dune and Omera that he plans to leave the Child there as he feels it would be a better life. However, a Kubazi bounty hunter from the Guild aims for the Child from the trees. Before he can fire, Dune shoots him from behind. The Mandalorian realizes the Child has to stay under his protection. He bids farewell to Omera and Dune and leaves the village.

Production

Development 
The episode was directed by Bryce Dallas Howard, who is the second woman to direct a live-action Star Wars project. According to Howard, Jon Favreau and Dave Filoni allowed individual episode directors the freedom to "put our stamp on everything". She said this surprised her father, Ron Howard, who directed Lucasfilm Solo: A Star Wars Story. The episode was written by showrunner Favreau. Favreau expected the episode to be difficult to shoot due to the forest, the water, and the mech. He picked Howard believing she would not be intimidated by how hard the task was, and thought she did a great job. Pedro Pascal was not present during the filming of the episode due to previous commitments to King Lear on Broadway. Stunt actors filled in as body doubles onscreen while Pascal performed all of the vocal elements in post-production.

In the local restaurant, an animal bares its fangs and hisses at the Child. The creature is called a Loth-cat, and first appeared in the animated series Star Wars Rebels and is native to the planet Lothal.

Casting 
In November 2018, Gina Carano was cast as Cara Dune. Additional guest starring actors cast for this episode include Julia Jones as Omera, Isla Farris as Winta, Asif Ali as Caben, Eugene Cordero as Stoke, Tiffany Thomas, Aydrea Walden and Trula Marcus as Sorgan farmers, Sala Baker as the Klatoonian raider captain, and Ida Darvish as the common house proprietor. Brendan Wayne and Lateef Crowder are credited as stunt doubles for The Mandalorian. Wayne worked closely with Pascal to develop the character's on-screen movements for the episode. Barry Lowin is credited as an additional double for The Mandalorian, while Amy Sturdivant and Lauren Mary Kim are credited as stunt doubles for Cara Dune and Omera, respectively. "The Child" was performed by various puppeteers.

Music 
Ludwig Göransson composed the musical score for the episode. The soundtrack album for the episode was released on November 29, 2019.

Reception 
On Rotten Tomatoes, the episode holds an approval rating of 89% with an average rating of 7.4/10, based on 27 reviews. The website's critics consensus reads, "Under director Bryce Dallas Howard's deft guidance, "Sanctuary" scales down on big action-set pieces to find intimate character moments, exposing a deeper sense of humanity underneath The Mandalorian metal suit."

Liz Shannon Miller of The A.V. Club gave the episode a grade A−, comparing it to Akira Kurosawa's Seven Samurai (1954), High Plains Drifter (1973), and Once Upon a Time in the West (1968). Miller wrote: "It's pretty impressive, how vigorously The Mandalorian is celebrating and incorporating classic Western tropes with each new episode, leaving no doubt whatsoever as to what creator Jon Favreau is trying to do here." She also praised the direction saying "episode director Bryce Dallas Howard makes sure that every beat is clean and precise, with an emotionally satisfying conclusion." Bryan Young of /Film compared the episode's plot to Seven Samurai. He praised Julia Jones, calling her a scene stealer, and praised Howard's direction. Young was critical of the music, calling it a near miss, as he did not feel it fit the tone of the episode. Tyler Hersko of IndieWire gave the episode a grade C+ and said the show had not "done much to subvert audience expectations" and was "still playing things safe, but that doesn't mean it isn't a consistently enjoyable affair." In particular, he praised the crew for bringing the AT-ST to life on the small screen, "it's glowing red cockpit pierces the shadows like a monster's eyes in a horror film, and its janky, heavy movements make it truly seem like a terrifying war machine."

Gina Carano as Cara Dune received positive responses from fans and critics. Will Thorne of Variety praised her fighting skills and compared Cara Dune to Gamora from the Guardians of the Galaxy films. Joanna Robinson of Vanity Fair called the character a "prime showcase for Carano" and the first role to capitalize on her "real-life, distinct blend of inherent sweetness and physical toughness".

Awards

The episode was nominated for the Primetime Emmy Award for Outstanding Single-Camera Picture Editing for a Drama Series.

References

External links 
 
 

2019 American television episodes
Television shows directed by Bryce Dallas Howard
The Mandalorian episodes